Jan Hieronim Chodkiewicz (died 12 September 1621) was a Polish nobleman of the Chodkiewicz family, that served as in 1621 as Lithuanian Great Deputy Master of the Pantry in Polish–Lithuanian Commonwealth. He was a member of parliament that represented Nowogródek Voivodeship during the 1616 sejm meeting. He was married to Krystyna Sapieżanka.

Notes

References

Bibliography 
 Urzędnicy centralni i dygnitarze Wielkiego Księstwa Litewskiego XIV-XVIII wieku. Spisy by Henryk Lulewicz and Andrzej Rachuba. Kórnik 1994, p. 203.
 Przedsejmowy sejmik nowogrodzki w latach 1607-1648 by Henryk Wisner in Przegląd Historyczny, vol. 69, number 4 (1978). p. 690.

17th-century Polish politicians
Government officials of the Polish–Lithuanian Commonwealth
17th-century Polish nobility
16th-century births
1621 deaths
Jan Hieronim
Members of the Sejm of the Polish–Lithuanian Commonwealth